The 2018 Arizona Diamondbacks season was the franchise's 20th season in Major League Baseball and their 20th season at Chase Field in Phoenix, Arizona as members of the National League West Division. They were managed by Torey Lovullo in his second season with the Diamondbacks.

The Diamondbacks began the regular season on March 29 against the Colorado Rockies and finished the season on September 30 against the San Diego Padres. The D-backs were in first place in the NL West on April 1, May 1, July 1, August 1 and September 1, but missed the playoffs after a September collapse.

The Diamondbacks started the season with nine consecutive series wins, the first National League team to do so since the 1907 Cubs. On July 7, the D-backs broke the franchise record for runs scored in a single game when they beat the Padres 20-5.

Offseason

Transactions 

Source

Regular season
In 2018, the Diamondbacks introduced a bullpen car, making them the first MLB team to use one since the Milwaukee Brewers in 1995.

Game log

|- align="center" bgcolor=ccffcc
| 1 || March 29 || Rockies ||8–2 || Corbin (1–0) || Gray (0–1) || || 48,703 || 1–0 || W1 
|- align="center" bgcolor=ccffcc
| 2 || March 30 || Rockies ||9–8|| Ray (1–0) || Senzatela (0–1) || Boxberger (1) || 23,937 || 2–0 || W2
|- align="center" bgcolor=ffcccc
| 3 || March 31 || Rockies ||1–2|| Shaw (1–0) || Salas (0–1) || Davis (1) || 33,346 || 2–1 || L1
|- align="center" bgcolor=ccffcc
| 4 || April 2 || Dodgers ||8–7 (15) || Salas (1–1) || Font (0–1) || — || 21,735 || 3–1 || W1
|- align="center" bgcolor=ccffcc
| 5 || April 3 || Dodgers ||6–1|| Godley (1–0) || Kershaw (0–2) || — || 27,574 || 4–1 || W2
|- align="center" bgcolor=ccffcc
| 6 || April 4 || Dodgers ||3–0|| Corbin (2–0) || Wood (0–1) || Boxberger (2) || 25,754 || 5–1 || W3
|- align="center" bgcolor=ccffcc
| 7 || April 5 || @ Cardinals || 3–1 || Ray (2–0) || Wainwright (0–1) || Boxberger (3) || 46,512 || 6–1 || W4
|- align="center" bgcolor=ffcccc
| 8 || April 7 || @ Cardinals || 3–5 || Wacha (1–1) || Greinke (0–1) || Norris (1) || 41,113 || 6–2 || L1
|- align="center" bgcolor=ccffcc
| 9 || April 8 || @ Cardinals || 4–1 || Hirano (1–0) || Leone (0–2) || Boxberger (4) || 40,468 || 7–2 || W1
|- align="center" bgcolor=ccffcc
| 10 || April 9 || @ Giants || 2–1 || Godley (2–0) || Holland (0–2) || Bradley (1) || 36,997 || 8–2 || W2 
|- align="center" bgcolor=ffcccc
| 11 || April 10 || @ Giants || 4–5 || Strickland (1–0) || de la Rosa (0–1) || — || 37,869 || 8–3 || L1
|- align="center" bgcolor=ccffcc
| 12 || April 11 || @ Giants || 7–3 || Salas (2–1) || Suarez (0–1) || — || 35,041 || 9–3 || W1
|- align="center" bgcolor=ccffcc
| 13 || April 13 || @ Dodgers || 8–7 || Greinke (1–1) || Maeda (1–1) || Boxberger (5) || 43,791 || 10–3 || W2
|- align="center" bgcolor=ccffcc
| 14 || April 14 || @ Dodgers || 9–1 || McFarland (1–0) || Hill (1–1) || — || 44,306 || 11–3 || W3
|- align="center" bgcolor=ffcccc
| 15 || April 15 || @ Dodgers || 2–7 || Kershaw (1–2) || Godley (2–1) || — || 47,527 || 11–4 || L1
|- align="center" bgcolor=ccffcc
| 16 || April 17 || Giants || 1–0 || Corbin (3–0) || Watson (1–1) || — || 19,669 || 12–4 || W1
|- align="center" bgcolor=ffcccc
| 17 || April 18 || Giants || 3–4 (10) || Strickland (2–0) || Boxberger (0–1) || Gearrin (1) || 16,976 || 12–5 || L1
|- align="center" bgcolor=ccffcc
| 18 || April 19 || Giants || 3–1 || Greinke (2–1) || Blach (1–3) || Boxberger (6) || 18,736 || 13–5 || W1 
|- align="center" bgcolor=ffcccc
| 19 || April 20 || Padres || 1–4 || Hand (1–2) || Boxberger (0–2) || — || 24,902 || 13–6 || L1
|- align="center" bgcolor=ccffcc
| 20 || April 21 || Padres || 6–2 || Godley (3–1) || Richard (1–2) || — || 38,820 || 14–6 || W1
|- align="center" bgcolor=ccffcc
| 21 || April 22 || Padres || 4–2 || Corbin (4–0) || Lucchesi (2–1) || Bradley (2) || 31,061 || 15–6 || W2
|- align="center" bgcolor=ccffcc
| 22 || April 24 || @ Phillies || 8–4 || Salas (3–1) || Velasquez (1–3) || — || 18,195 || 16–6 || W3
|- align="center" bgcolor=ffcccc
| 23 || April 25 || @ Phillies || 3–5 || Arrieta (3–0) || Greinke (2–2) || Neris (5) || 21,349 || 16–7 || L1
|- align="center" bgcolor=ccffcc
| 24 || April 26 || @ Phillies || 8–2 || Koch (1–0) || Lively (0–2) || — || 20,335 || 17–7 || W1
|- align="center" bgcolor=ccffcc
| 25 || April 27 || @ Nationals || 5–4 || Godley (4–1) || Strasburg (2–3) || Boxberger (7) || 26,517 || 18–7 || W2
|- align="center" bgcolor=ccffcc
| 26 || April 28 || @ Nationals || 4–3 (10) || Hirano (2–0) || Solis (0–1) || Boxberger (8)  || 32,963 || 19–7 || W3
|- align="center" bgcolor=ffcccc
| 27 || April 29 || @ Nationals || 1–3 || González (3–2) || McFarland (1–1) || Doolittle (5) || 30,285 || 19–8 || L1
|- align="center" bgcolor=ccffcc
| 28 || April 30 || Dodgers || 8–5 || Greinke (3–2) || Stripling (0–1) || Boxberger (9) || 17,562 || 20–8 || W1
|-

|- align="center" bgcolor=ccffcc
| 29 || May 1 || Dodgers || 4–3 || Bracho (1–0) || Liberatore (1–1) || Boxberger (10) || 18,940 || 21–8 || W2
|- align="center" bgcolor=ffcccc
| 30 || May 2 || Dodgers || 1–2 || Hudson (1–0) || Godley (4–2) || Jansen (4) || 19,531 || 21–9 || L1
|- align="center" bgcolor=ffcccc
| 31 || May 3 || Dodgers || 2–5 || Chargois (1–0) || Salas (3–2) || Jansen (5) || 21,407 || 21–10 || L2
|- align="center" bgcolor=ffcccc
| 32 || May 4 || Astros || 0–8 || Cole (3–1) || Medlen (0–1) || — || 29,463 || 21–11 || L3
|- align="center" bgcolor=ccffcc
| 33 || May 5 || Astros || 4–3 || Boxberger (1–2) || Devenski (1–1) || — || 39,154 || 22–11 || W1
|- align="center" bgcolor=ccffcc
| 34 || May 6 || Astros || 3–1 || Koch (2–0) || Verlander (4–1) || Boxberger (11) || 35,632 || 23–11 || W2
|- align="center" bgcolor=ccffcc
| 35 || May 8 || @ Dodgers || 8–5 (12) || McFarland (2–1) || García (0–1) || — || 45,894 || 24–11 || W3
|- align="center" bgcolor=ffcccc
| 36 || May 9 || @ Dodgers || 3–6 || Báez (1–1) || Salas (3–3) || Jansen (6) || 45,600 || 24–12 || L1
|- align="center" bgcolor=ffcccc
| 37 || May 10 || Nationals || 1–2 (11) || Kintzler (1–2) || Salas (3–4) || Doolittle (7) || 17,397 || 24–13 || L2
|- align="center" bgcolor=ffcccc
| 38 || May 11 || Nationals || 1–3 || Scherzer (7–1) || Koch (2–1) || Doolittle (8) || 22,901 || 24–14 || L3
|- align="center" bgcolor=ffcccc
| 39 || May 12 || Nationals || 1–2 || Strasburg (5–3) || Scribner (0–1) || Madson (3) || 29,428 || 24–15 || L4 
|- align="center" bgcolor=ffcccc
| 40 || May 13 || Nationals || 4–6 || Madson (1–2) || Bradley (0–1) || Doolittle (9) || 31,906 || 24–16 || L5
|- align="center" bgcolor=ffcccc
| 41 || May 14 || Brewers || 2–7 || Guerra (3–3) || Corbin (4–1) || — || 17,390 || 24–17 || L6
|- align="center" bgcolor=ccffcc
| 42 || May 15 || Brewers || 2–1 || Bradley (1–1) || Williams (0–1) || Boxberger (12) || 17,914 || 25–17 || W1
|- align="center" bgcolor=ffcccc
| 43 || May 16 || Brewers || 2–8 || Woodruff (2–0) || Koch (2–2) || — || 16,762 || 25–18 || L1
|- align="center" bgcolor=ffcccc
| 44 || May 18 || @ Mets || 1–3 || deGrom (4–0) ||Godley (4–3) || Familia (12) || 31,285 || 25–19 || L2
|- align="center" bgcolor=ffcccc
| 45 || May 19 || @ Mets || 4–5 ||Familia (2–1) || Chafin (0–1) || — || 39,515 || 25–20 || L3
|- align="center" bgcolor=ffcccc
| 46 || May 20 || @ Mets || 1–4 || Syndergaard (4–1) || de la Rosa (0–2) || Gsellman (1) || 34,894 || 25–21 || L4
|- align="center" bgcolor=ffcccc
| 47 || May 21 || @ Brewers || 2–4 || Anderson (4–3) || Greinke (3–3) || Knebel (2) || 27,094 || 25–22 || L5
|- align="center" bgcolor=ffcccc
| 48 || May 22 || @ Brewers || 0–1 || Albers (3–1) || Koch (2–3) || Knebel (3) || 27,065 || 25–23 || L6
|- align="center" bgcolor=ffcccc
| 49 || May 23 || @ Brewers || 2–9 || Suter (4–3) || Godley (4–4) || — || 29,237 || 25–24 || L7
|- align="center" bgcolor=ccffcc
| 50 || May 25 || @ A's || 7–1 || Corbin (5–1) || Manaea (5–5) || — || 22,691 || 26–24 || W1 
|- align="center" bgcolor=ffcccc
| 51 || May 26 || @ A's || 0–3 || Mengden (5–4) || Buchholz (0–1) || — || 17,580 || 26–25 || L1
|- align="center" bgcolor=ffcccc
| 52 || May 27 || @ A's || 1–2 || Montas (1–0) || Greinke (3–4) || Treinen (12) || 13,947 || 26–26 || L2
|- align="center" bgcolor=ccffcc
| 53 || May 28 || Reds || 12–5 || Koch (3–3) || Bailey (1–7) || — || 29,924 || 27–26 || W1
|- align="center" bgcolor=ccffcc
| 54 || May 29 || Reds || 5–2 || Godley (5–4) || Castillo (4–5) || Boxberger (13) || 20,046 || 28–26 || W2
|- align="center" bgcolor=ffcccc
| 55 || May 30 || Reds || 4–7 || Romano (3–6) || Corbin (5–2) || Iglesias (9) || 18,340 || 28–27 || L1
|-

|- align="center" bgcolor=ccffcc
| 56 || June 1 || Marlins || 9–1 || Buchholz (1–1) || Hernandez (0–3) || — || 25,866 || 29–27 || W1 
|- align="center" bgcolor=ccffcc
| 57 || June 2 || Marlins || 6–2 || Greinke (4–4) || Smith (4–6) || — || 34,117 || 30–27 || W2 
|- align="center" bgcolor=ccffcc
| 58 || June 3 || Marlins || 6–1 || Koch (4–3) || Straily (2–2) || — || 31,727 || 31–27 || W3 
|- align="center" bgcolor=ffcccc
| 59 || June 4 || @ Giants || 3–10 || Johnson (3–2) || Godley (5–5) || — || 36,542 || 31–28 || L1
|- align="center" bgcolor=ccffcc
| 60 || June 5 || @ Giants || 3–2 || Corbin (6–2) || Bumgarner (0–1) || Boxberger (14) || 36,925 || 32–28 || W1
|- align="center" bgcolor=ffcccc
| 61 || June 6 || @ Giants || 4–5 (10) || Strickland (3–2) || Chafin (0–2) || — || 41,042 || 32–29 || L1
|- align="center" bgcolor=ccffcc
| 62 || June 8 || @ Rockies || 9–4 || Greinke (5–4) || Márquez (4–6) || — || 38,917 || 33–29 || W1  
|- align="center" bgcolor=ccffcc
| 63 || June 9 || @ Rockies || 12–7 || Bracho (2–0) || Shaw (2–5) || — || 43,197 || 34–29 || W2 
|- align="center" bgcolor=ccffcc
| 64 || June 10 || @ Rockies || 8–3 || Godley (6–5) || Freeland (6–6) || — || 36,433 || 35–29 || W3
|- align="center" bgcolor=ccffcc
| 65 || June 11 || Pirates || 9–5 || Bradley (2–1) || Crick (0–1) || — || 20,927 || 36–29 || W4 
|- align="center" bgcolor=ccffcc
| 66 || June 12 || Pirates || 13–8 || Salas (4–4) || Williams (5–4) || — || 22,488 || 37–29 || W5 
|- align="center" bgcolor=ffcccc
| 67 || June 13 || Pirates || 4–5 || Taillon (4–5) || Greinke (5–5) || Vázquez (12) || 32,803 || 37–30 || L1
|- align="center" bgcolor=ccffcc
| 68 || June 14 || Mets || 6–3 || Koch (5–3) || Vargas (2–5) || Boxberger (15) || 23,300 || 38–30 || W1
|- align="center" bgcolor=ccffcc
| 69 || June 15 || Mets || 7–3 || Godley (7–5) || Lugo (2–2) || Boxberger (16) || 32,170 || 39–30 || W2
|- align="center" bgcolor=ffcccc
| 70 || June 16 || Mets || 1–5 || Matz (3–4) || Corbin (6–3) || — || 31,824 || 39–31 || L1
|- align="center" bgcolor=ffcccc
| 71 || June 17 || Mets || 3–5 || Familia (3–3) || Boxberger (1–3) || Gsellman (3) || 47,907 || 39–32 || L2
|- align="center" bgcolor=ccffcc
| 72 || June 18 || @ Angels || 7–4 || Greinke (6–5) || Barria (5–3) || Bradley (3) || 33,809 || 40–32 || W1  
|- align="center" bgcolor=ffcccc
| 73 || June 19 || @ Angels || 4–5 || Álvarez (3–2) || Koch (5–4) || Parker (8) || 33,088 || 40–33 || L1
|- align="center" bgcolor=ccffcc
| 74 || June 21 || @ Pirates || 9–3 || Godley (8–5) || Kuhl (5–5) || — || 20,554 || 41–33 || W1
|- align="center" bgcolor=ccffcc
| 75 || June 22 || @ Pirates || 2–1 (13) || Chafin (1–2) || Glasnow (1–2) || McFarland (1) || 24,843 || 42–33 || W2 
|- align="center" bgcolor=ccffcc
| 76 || June 23 || @ Pirates || 7–2 || Greinke (7–5) || Musgrove (2–3) || — || 21,121 || 43–33 || W3   
|- align="center" bgcolor=ccffcc
| 77 || June 24 || @ Pirates || 3–0 || Buchholz (2–1) || Williams (6–5) || Boxberger (17) || 19,207 || 44–33 || W4 
|- align="center" bgcolor=ffcccc
| 78 || June 25 || @ Marlins || 5–9 || Straily (3–3) || Miller (0–1) || — || 6,105 || 44–34 || L1
|- align="center" bgcolor=ccffcc
| 79 || June 26 || @ Marlins || 5–3 || Godley (9–5) || Hernández (0–5) || Boxberger (18) || 6,159 || 45–34 || W1
|- align="center" bgcolor=ccffcc
| 80 || June 27 || @ Marlins || 2–1 || Ray (3–0) || Chen (2–5) || Boxberger (19) || 6,382 || 46–34 || W2
|- align="center" bgcolor=ccffcc
| 81 || June 28 || @ Marlins || 4–0 || Greinke (8–5) || Richards (2–5) || — || 12,715 || 47–34 || W3
|- align="center" bgcolor=ffcccc
| 82 || June 29 || Giants || 1–2 || Suarez (3–4) || Chafin (1–3) || Smith (1) || 30,981 || 47–35 || L1
|- align="center" bgcolor=ffcccc
| 83 || June 30 || Giants || 0–7 || Rodríguez (3–1) || Miller (0–2) || — || 38,117 || 47–36 || L2
|-

|- align="center" bgcolor=ffcccc
| 84 || July 1 || Giants || 6–9 || Gearrin (1–1) || Godley (9–6) || Smith (2) || 29,721 || 47–37 || L3
|- align="center" bgcolor=ffcccc
| 85 || July 2 || Cardinals || 3–6 || Martínez (5–4) || Ray (3–1) || Norris (16) || 20,334 || 47–38 || L4
|- align="center" bgcolor=ccffcc
| 86 || July 3 || Cardinals || 4–2 || Greinke (9–5) || Flaherty (3–4) || Boxberger (20) || 25,843 || 48–38 || W1
|- align="center" bgcolor=ffcccc
| 87 || July 4 || Cardinals || 4–8 || Mikolas (9–3) || Hirano (2–1) || — || 44,072 || 48–39 || L1
|- align="center" bgcolor=ffcccc
| 88 || July 5 || Padres || 3–6 || Lauer (4–5) || Miller (0–3) || Hand (24) || 17,982 || 48–40 || L2
|- align="center" bgcolor=ccffcc
| 89 || July 6 || Padres || 3–1 || Godley (10–6) || Lucchesi (4–4) || Boxberger (21) || 25,128 || 49–40 || W1
|- align="center" bgcolor=ccffcc
| 90 || July 7 || Padres || 20–5 || Delgado (1–0) || Ross (5–7) || — || 27,091 || 50–40 || W2
|- align="center" bgcolor=ffcccc
| 91 || July 8 || Padres || 3–4 (16) || Hand (2–4) || Mathis (0–1) || — || 24,869 || 50–41 || L1 
|- align="center" bgcolor=ccffcc
| 92 || July 10 || @ Rockies || 5–3 || Delgado (2–0) || McGee (1–3) || Boxberger (22) || 43,405 || 51–41 || W1
|- align="center" bgcolor=ffcccc
| 93 || July 11 || @ Rockies || 2–19 || Márquez (8–8) || Miller (0–4) || — || 33,919 || 51–42 || L1
|- align="center" bgcolor=ffcccc
| 94 || July 12 || @ Rockies || 1–5 || Oberg (3–0) || Ray (3–2) || — || 41,410 || 51–43 || L2
|- align="center" bgcolor=ccffcc
| 95 || July 13 || @ Braves || 2–1 || Godley (11–6) || Freeman (2–5) || Boxberger (23) || 42,130 || 52–43 || W1
|- align="center" bgcolor=ccffcc
| 96 || July 14 || @ Braves || 3–0 || Greinke (10–5) || Newcomb (8–5) || Boxberger (24) || 40,862 || 53–43 || W2
|- align="center" bgcolor=ffcccc
| 97 || July 15 || @ Braves || 1–5 || Teherán (7–6) || Corbin (6–4) || — || 27,323 || 53–44 || L1
|- align="center" bgcolor=bbcaff
|– || July 17 || colspan="8" | 89th All-Star Game in Washington, D.C.
|- align="center" bgcolor=ffcccc
| 98 || July 20 || Rockies || 10–11 || Oberg (5–0) || Bradley (2–2) || Ottavino (3) || 29,546 || 53–45 || L2
|- align="center" bgcolor=ffcccc
| 99 || July 21 || Rockies || 5–6 || Oberg (6–0) || Hirano (2–2) || Davis (28) || 43,340 || 53–46 || L3
|- align="center" bgcolor=ccffcc
| 100 || July 22 || Rockies || 6–1 || Greinke (11–5) || Senzatela (3–3) || — || 32,985 || 54–46 || W1
|- align="center" bgcolor=ccffcc
| 101 || July 23 || @ Cubs || 7–1 || Corbin (7–4) || Farrell (3–4) || — || 40,859 || 55–46 || W2
|- align="center" bgcolor=ccffcc
| 102 || July 24 || @ Cubs || 5–1 || Buchholz (3–1) || Hendricks (6–9) || — || 40,869 || 56–46 || W3 
|- align="center" bgcolor=ffcccc
| 103 || July 25 || @ Cubs || 1–2 || Edwards Jr. (3–1) || McFarland (2–2) || Strop (4) || 35,548 || 56–47 || L1
|- align="center" bgcolor=ffcccc
| 104 || July 26 || @ Cubs || 6–7 || Butler (1–1) || Boxberger (1–4) || — || 38,978 || 56–48 || L2
|- align="center" bgcolor=ccffcc
| 105 || July 27 || @ Padres || 6–2 || Greinke (12–5) || Perdomo (1–6) || — || 34,725 || 57–48 || W1
|- align="center" bgcolor=ccffcc
| 106 || July 28 || @ Padres || 9–4 || Bradley (3–2) || Maton (0–1) || — || 37,149 || 58–48 || W2 
|- align="center" bgcolor=ccffcc
| 107 || July 29 || @ Padres || 5–4 || Buchholz (4–1) || Lucchesi (5–6) || Boxberger (25) || 32,529 || 59–48 || W3 
|- align="center" bgcolor=ffcccc
| 108 || July 30 || Rangers || 5–9 || Butler (2–1) || Andriese (3–5) || — || 20,639 || 59–49 || L1
|-  align="center" bgcolor=ccffcc
| 109 || July 31 || Rangers || 6–0 || Godley (12–6) || Colón (5–10) || — || 21,877 || 60–49 || W1
|-

|- align="center" bgcolor=ffcccc
| 110 || August 2 || Giants || 1–8 || Bumgarner (4–4) || Greinke (12–6) || — || 22,980 || 60–50 || L1
|- align="center" bgcolor=ccffcc
| 111 || August 3 || Giants || 6–3 || Corbin (8–4) || Stratton (8–7) || Boxberger (26) || 27,581 || 61–50 || W1
|- align="center" bgcolor=ccffcc
| 112 || August 4 || Giants || 9–3 || Buchholz (5–1) || Suarez (4–7) || — || 38,093 || 62–50 || W2 
|- align="center" bgcolor=ffcccc
| 113 || August 5 || Giants || 2–3 || Black (1–0) || Bradley (3–3) || Smith (7) || 27,884 || 62–51 || L1 
|- align="center" bgcolor=ccffcc
| 114 || August 6 || Phillies || 3–2 (14) || Hirano (3–2) || Davis (1–2) || — || 21,131 || 63–51 || W1
|- align="center" bgcolor=ffcccc
| 115 || August 7 || Phillies || 2–5 || Pivetta (7–9) || Greinke (12–7) || Neshek (2) || 22,382 || 63–52 || L1
|- align="center" bgcolor=ccffcc
| 116 || August 8 || Phillies || 6–0 || Corbin (9–4) || Velasquez (8–9) || — || 23,384 || 64–52 || W1
|- align="center" bgcolor=ffcccc
| 117 || August 10 || @ Reds || 0–3 || DeSclafani (6–3) || Buchholz (5–2) || Iglesias (22) || 19,089 || 64–53 || L1
|- align="center" bgcolor=ffcccc
| 118 || August 11 || @ Reds || 3–6 || Garrett (1–2) || Bradley (3–4) || Iglesias (23) || 29,348 || 64–54 || L2
|- align="center" bgcolor=ccffcc
| 119 || August 12 || @ Reds || 9–2 || Godley (13–6) || Castillo (6–10) || — || 17,909 || 65–54 || W1
|- align="center" bgcolor=ffcccc
| 120 || August 13 || @ Rangers || 3–5 || Colón (7–10) || Greinke (12–8) || Leclerc (2) || 18,204 || 65–55 || L1
|- align="center" bgcolor=ccffcc
| 121 || August 14 || @ Rangers || 6–4 || Corbin (10–4) || Gallardo (7–2) || Boxberger (27) || 19,353 || 66–55 || W1 
|- align="center" bgcolor=ccffcc
| 122 || August 16 || @ Padres || 5–1 || Buchholz (6–2) || Nix (1–1) || — || 20,617 || 67–55 || W2  
|- align="center" bgcolor=ccffcc
| 123 || August 17 || @ Padres || 9–4 || Hirano (4–2) || Lucchesi (6–7) || — || 20,010 || 68–55 || W3 
|- align="center" bgcolor=ffcccc
| 124 || August 18 || @ Padres || 6–7 || Stammen (6–2) || Chafin (1–4) || — || 24,440 || 68–56 || L1
|- align="center" bgcolor=ccffcc
| 125 || August 19 || @ Padres || 4–3 || Bradley (4–4) || Yates (4–2) || Boxberger (28) || 22,346 || 69–56 || W1
|- align="center" bgcolor=ccffcc
| 126 || August 21 || Angels || 5–4 || Boxberger (2–4) || Bedrosian (5–3) || — || 30,420 || 70–56 || W2
|- align="center" bgcolor=ccffcc
| 127 || August 22 || Angels || 5–1 || Buchholz (7–2) || Despaigne (2–2) || — || 23,584 || 71–56 || W3
|- align="center" bgcolor=ffcccc
| 128 || August 24 || Mariners || 3–6 || Ramírez (1–2) || Godley (13–7) || Díaz (49) || 43,867 || 71–57 || L1
|- align="center" bgcolor=ffcccc
| 129 || August 25 || Mariners || 3–6 || Colomé (5–5) || Diekman (1–2) || Díaz (50) || 34,968 || 71–58 || L2
|- align="center" bgcolor=ccffcc
| 130 || August 26 || Mariners || 5–2 || Greinke (13–8) || Leake (8–8) || Boxberger (29) || 37,175 || 72–58 || W1
|- align="center" bgcolor=ffcccc
| 131 || August 27 || @ Giants || 0–2 || Stratton (9–7) || Corbin (10–5) || Strickland (14) || 38,808 || 72–59 || L1
|- align="center" bgcolor=ffcccc
| 132 || August 28 || @ Giants || 0–1 || Smith (2–2) || Ziegler (1–6) || — || 37,276 || 72–60 || L2
|- align="center" bgcolor=ccffcc
| 133 || August 29 || @ Giants || 3–1 || Godley (14–7)  ||Rodríguez (6–2) || Boxberger (30) || 35,626 || 73–60 || W1
|- align="center" bgcolor=ccffcc
| 134 || August 30 || @ Dodgers || 3–1 || Ray (4–2) || Hill (6–5) || Boxberger (31) || 45,150 || 74–60 || W2
|- align="center" bgcolor=ffcccc
| 135 || August 31 || @ Dodgers || 2–3 || Floro (5–3) || Greinke (13–9) || Jansen (33) || 48,965 || 74–61 || L1 
|-

|- align="center" bgcolor=ffcccc
| 136 || September 1 || @ Dodgers || 2–3 || Maeda (8–8) || Bradley (4–5) || Jansen (34) || 52,394 || 74–62 || L2
|- align="center" bgcolor=ffcccc
| 137 || September 2 || @ Dodgers || 2–3 || Jansen (1–5) || Boxberger (2–5) || — || 48,517 || 74–63 || L3
|- align="center" bgcolor=ffcccc
| 138 || September 3 || Padres || 2–6 || Mitchell (1–3) || Godley (14–8) || — || 22,514 || 74–64 || L4
|- align="center" bgcolor=ccffcc
| 139 || September 4 || Padres || 6–0 || Ray (5–2) || Lucchesi (7–8) || — || 18,556 || 75–64 || W1
|- align="center" bgcolor=ffcccc
| 140 || September 6 || Braves || 6–7 || Biddle (5–1) || Boxberger (2–6) || Brach (12) || 21,903 || 75–65 || L1 
|- align="center" bgcolor=ccffcc
| 141 || September 7 || Braves || 5–3 || Corbin (11–5) || Gausman (9–10) || Boxberger (32) || 31,308 || 76–65 || W1
|- align="center" bgcolor=ffcccc
| 142 || September 8 || Braves || 4–5 || Sobotka (1–0) || Chafin (1–5) || Minter (13) || 40,482 || 76–66 || L1
|- align="center" bgcolor=ffcccc
| 143 || September 9 || Braves || 5–9 || Freeman (3–5) || Boxberger (2–7) || — || 28,339 || 76–67 || L2
|- align="center" bgcolor=ffcccc
| 144 || September 10 || @ Rockies || 2–13 || Márquez (12–9) || Godley (14–9) || — || 25,114 || 76–68 || L3 
|- align="center" bgcolor=ccffcc
| 145 || September 11 || @ Rockies || 6–3 || Greinke (14–9) || Senzatela (4–6) || Hirano (1) || 26,510 || 77–68 || W1
|- align="center" bgcolor=ffcccc
| 146 || September 12 || @ Rockies || 4–5 || Davis (3–6) || Hirano (4–3) || — || 31,687 || 77–69 || L1
|- align="center" bgcolor=ffcccc
| 147 || September 13 || @ Rockies || 3–10 || Freeland (15–7) || Koch (5–5) || — || 31,783 || 77–70 || L2
|- align="center" bgcolor=ccffcc
| 148 || September 14 || @ Astros || 4–2 || Ziegler (2–6) || Rondón (2–4) || Hirano (2) || 36,924 || 78–70 || W1
|- align="center" bgcolor=ffcccc
| 149 || September 15 || @ Astros || 4–10 || Morton (15–3) || Godley (14–10) || — || 38,345 || 78–71 || L1
|- align="center" bgcolor=ffcccc
| 150 || September 16 || @ Astros || 4–5 || Verlander (16–9) || Greinke (14–10) || Osuna (18) || 37,889 || 78–72 || L2
|- align="center" bgcolor=ffcccc
| 151 || September 17 || Cubs || 1–5 || Hendricks (12–11) || Corbin (11–6) || — || 27,662 || 78–73 || L3
|- align="center" bgcolor=ffcccc
| 152 || September 18 || Cubs || 1–9 || Montgomery (5–5) || Andriese (3–6) || — || 26,095 || 78–74 || L4
|- align="center" bgcolor=ccffcc
| 153 || September 19 || Cubs || 9–0 || Ray (6–2) || Hamels (9–10) || — || 25,715 || 79–74 || W1
|- align="center" bgcolor=ffcccc
| 154 || September 21 || Rockies || 2–6 || Marquez (13–10) || Greinke (14–11) || — || 28,833 || 79–75 || L1 
|- align="center" bgcolor=ffcccc
| 155 || September 22 || Rockies || 1–5 || Senzatela (5–6) || Corbin (11–7) || — || 35,094 || 79–76 || L2 
|- align="center" bgcolor=ffcccc
| 156 || September 23 || Rockies || 0–2 || Freeland (16–7) || Godley (14–11) || Davis (41) || 29,191 || 79–77 || L3
|- align="center" bgcolor=ffcccc
| 157 || September 24 || Dodgers || 4–7 || Kershaw (9–5) || Chafin (1–6) || — || 26,067 || 79–78 || L4 
|- align="center" bgcolor=ccffcc
| 158 || September 25 || Dodgers || 4–3 || Boxberger (3–7) || Maeda (8–10) || — || 25,774 || 80–78 || W1
|- align="center" bgcolor=ccffcc
| 159 || September 26 || Dodgers || 7–2 || Greinke (15–11) || Stripling (8–6) || — || 31,149 || 81–78 || W2
|- align="center" bgcolor=ffcccc
| 160 || September 28 || @ Padres || 2–3 (15) || Brewer (1–0) || Andriese (3–7) || — || 28,055 || 81–79 || L1
|- align="center" bgcolor=ccffcc
| 161 || September 29 || @ Padres || 5–4 || Godley (15–11) || Nix (2–5) || Hirano (3) || 28,024 || 82–79 || W1
|- align="center" bgcolor=ffcccc
| 162 || September 30 || @ Padres || 3–4 || Castillo (3–3) || Barrett (0–1) || — || 31,243 || 82–80 || L1
|-

|-
| Legend:       = Win       = Loss       = PostponementBold = Diamondbacks team member

Season standings

National League West

National League Wild Card

Record vs. opponents

Roster

Minor league affiliations

References

External links
2018 Arizona Diamondbacks season at Baseball Reference

Arizona Diamondbacks
Arizona Diamondbacks
Arizona Diamondbacks seasons